Governor Pitt may refer to:

George Morton Pitt (1693–1756), Governor of the Madras Presidency at Fort St. George from 1730 to 1735
John Pitt (soldier) (1698–1754), Governor of Bermuda from 1728 to 1737
John Pitt, 2nd Earl of Chatham (1756–1835), Governor of Plymouth from 1805 to 1807, Governor of Jersey from 1807 to 1821, and Governor of Gibraltar from 1820 to 1825
Thomas Pitt (1653–1726), Governor of Jamaica from 1716 to 1717
Thomas Pitt, 1st Earl of Londonderry (1668–1729), Governor of the Leeward Islands from 1728 to 1729